is a Japanese footballer who plays as a forward for INAC Kobe Leonessa in the WE League and the Japanese national team.

Club career
Takase was born in Kitami on November 10, 1990. After graduating from high school, she joined INAC Kobe Leonessa in 2009. In 2009 season, she was selected Best Young Player awards. In 2012, she scored 20 goals in 18 games and became top scorer. she was also selected MVP awards.

International career
On January 15, 2010, Takase debuted for the Japan national team against Chile. In July, she was selected to play for the Japan U-20 national team at the 2010 U-20 World Cup. She was a member of Japan's squad for the 2011 World Cup and the 2012 Summer Olympics. Japan won the championship at the 2011 World Cup and won a silver medal at the 2012 Summer Olympics. In Asia, she was also a squad member for the 2010 Asian Games and the 2014 Asian Cup. Japan won the championship at both tournaments. She played 61 games and scored 9 goals for Japan until 2016.

Personal life
Takase's brother Akira Takase is also a footballer.

Career statistics

Club

International

Scores and results list Japan's goal tally first, score column indicates score after each Takase goal.

Honours
 INAC Kobe Leonessa
 Nadeshiko League: 2011, 2012, 2013
 WE League: 2021–22

 Empress's Cup: 2010, 2011, 2012, 2013, 2015, 2016
 Nadeshiko League Cup: 2013

 Japan
 FIFA Women's World Cup: 2011

 Asian Games: 2010

 East Asian Football Championship: 2010
Japan U20
 AFC U-19 Women's Championship: 2009

References

External links

Japan Football Association

1990 births
Living people
Association football people from Hokkaido
Japanese women's footballers
Japan women's international footballers
Nadeshiko League players
INAC Kobe Leonessa players
FIFA Women's World Cup-winning players
2011 FIFA Women's World Cup players
Olympic footballers of Japan
Olympic silver medalists for Japan
Olympic medalists in football
Medalists at the 2012 Summer Olympics
Footballers at the 2012 Summer Olympics
Asian Games medalists in football
Medalists at the 2010 Asian Games
Medalists at the 2014 Asian Games
Footballers at the 2010 Asian Games
Footballers at the 2014 Asian Games
Asian Games gold medalists for Japan
Asian Games silver medalists for Japan
People from Kitami, Hokkaido
Women's association football forwards
Nadeshiko League MVPs